Garrie may refer to:

 Garrie (given name), a masculine given name
 Garrie (surname), a British surname

See also

 Garie (disambiguation)
 Garri (disambiguation)
 Garry (disambiguation)
 Gerrie (disambiguation)
 Gharry
 Jarrie